Bjelanović is a Serbo-Croatian surname, a patronymic derived from Bjelan. It may refer to:

Saša Bjelanović (born 1979), retired Croatian footballer
Sava Bjelanović (1850–1897), Dalmatian Serb politician
Darko Bjelanović (born 1991), Serbian footballer

Serbian surnames